The 1950–51 Bradford City A.F.C. season was the 38th in the club's history.

The club finished 7th in Division Three North, and reached the 1st round of the FA Cup.

Sources

References

Bradford City A.F.C. seasons
Bradford City